Dimitri Donskoj, is a 1909 Russian short film directed by Kai Hansen.

Starring 
 Vladimir Karin as The farmer's son
 I. Langfeld as The farmer
 Matveieff as Dimitry Donskoy
 Nina Rutkovskaia as The young girl
 Voinoff

References

External links 
 

1909 films
1900s Russian-language films
Russian silent short films
1909 short films
Silent films in color
Russian black-and-white films
Films of the Russian Empire
Films directed by Kai Hansen